Eudocima tyrannus is a moth of the family Erebidae first described by Achille Guenée in 1852. It is found in south-eastern Siberia, India, eastern China, the Philippines and Japan.

The wingspan is about 95 mm.

References

Eudocima
Moths of Asia
Moths of Japan
Moths described in 1852